O.G. Original Gangster is the fourth studio album by American rapper Ice-T, released May 14, 1991 by Sire Records. Recording took place from July 1990 to January 1991 in Los Angeles. Its production was handled by seven producers: Afrika Islam, Beatmaster V, Bilal Bashir, DJ Aladdin, Nat the Cat, SLJ and Ice-T himself, who also served as executive producer. It features guest appearances from Body Count, Prince Whipper Whip and various Rhyme Syndicate artists, such as Donald D, Evil E and Randy Mac.

The album peaked at number 15 on the U.S. Billboard 200 and number 9 on the Top R&B/Hip-Hop Albums chart. On July 24, 1991, it was certified gold by the Recording Industry Association of America, indicating U.S. sales of more than 500,000 units. O.G. Original Gangster was ranked at #25 in Melody Makers list of the top 30 albums of 1991, and was featured in The Source 100 Best Rap Albums and the book 1001 Albums You Must Hear Before You Die. The album was praised by many as his best.

Release
On the album's release, the vinyl version only contained 16 of the compact disc's 24 tracks. The NME stated to "forget the format's limitations" and promoted the compact disc version with 24 tracks over the lp.

Reception

From contemporary reviews, NME critic Dele Fadele praised O.G. Original Gangster as Ice-T's "best shot yet; riotous vignettes from a decaying America full of devious humour and striking pathos – all those things NWA profess to be but clearly aren't." Fadele found that the music "is always restlessly inventive in catering for your solar plexus (even on the hardcore/Heavy Metal crossover token track)" and "complements highlights like the sad, droning 'The Tower', the optimistic 'Escape from the Killing Fields' (a scathing re-write of Public Enemy's 'Black Steel in the Hour of Chaos' that explains the original metaphor) and the out-of-character bad-tempered 'Lifestyles of the Rich and Infamous'".

In a negative review for Select, Adam Higginbotham wrote that only three tracks – "Mind Over Matter", "The Tower" and "The House" – are "outstanding", while "much of the rest relies on a well-tested recipe of looped breakbeats and linear drums"; he concluded that the album "often functions better as manifesto than as music."

Track listing

Notes
  signifies a songwriter that is only listed on music streaming services.Sample Credits'
 "Bitches 2" contains a sample from "Dr. Funkenstein", written by George Clinton, George Worrell and William Collins, as performed by Parliament.

Personnel
Credits adapted from the album's liner notes.

 Tracy Lauren Marrow – main artist, producer (tracks: 1-13, 16-24), executive producer, arranging
 Alphonso Henderson – featured performer (tracks: 6, 9), producer (tracks: 1, 4-6, 8-11, 14-15, 21-22), project supervisor
 Donald Lamont – featured performer (tracks: 4, 13)
 Sean E. Sean – featured performer (tracks: 17, 23)
 Victor Ray Wilson – featured performer (track 18), producer (track 7)
 Nat the Cat – featured performer (track 13), producer (track 7)
 Lloyd "Mooseman" Roberts III – featured performer (track 18)
 Ernie Cunnigan – featured performer (track 18)
 Dennis Miles – featured performer (track 18)
 Charlie Jam – featured performer (track 8)
 Randy Mac – featured performer (track 14)
 James Whipper – featured performer (track 15)
 K. Alexander – featured performer (track 21)
 Eric Garcia – scratches
 Shafiq "SLJ" Husayn – producer (tracks: 1, 4, 8-10, 14, 15, 21)
 Charles Andre Glenn – producer (tracks: 3, 13, 16, 17, 20)
 Bilal Bashir – producer (track 23)
 Vachik Aghaniantz – recording & mixing
 Dennis "Def-Pea" Parker – recording
 Steve Battman – recording
 Tim Stedman – design
 Glen E. Friedman – photography
 "King James" Cassimus – photography
 Jorge Hinojosa – management

Charts

Weekly charts

Year-end charts

Certifications

References

External links

1991 albums
Ice-T albums
Sire Records albums
Albums produced by Afrika Islam
Albums produced by DJ Aladdin